The Diocese of Laodicea in Phrygia, is an important Titular Christian Diocese, centered on the biblical city of Laodicea on the Lycus in modern Turkey.
The Church at Laodicea was a centre of Christianity from a very early point. The New Testament indicates a Christian presence in Laodicea as early as the AD 50s.
The church is mentioned extensively in the epistle to the Colossians, and the First Epistle to Timothy may have been written here. Further, the church was one of the Seven churches of Asia.
A bishop was appointed in Apostolic Times, with numerous suffragean bishop attached.

Residential bishops
 Archippus, of the Bible.
Nymphas.
Diotrephes
Sagaris, martyr (c. 166).
Sagar of Laodicea c175
Sisinnius
 Diodorus of Laodicea 303/04
Nunechius I, Council of Nicaea (325) 
Eugenius
Theodotus 334
 Cecropius of Nicomedia (350). There are 14 named Bishops after Cecropius in the Notitiae Episcopatuum.
 Nonnus of Laodicea   343AD succeeded Cecropius
 Nymphas 300s???
 Aristonicus  381
Apollinaris of Laodicea  390
 Paul 431
 Nunechius 449
 Messalinus of Laodicea  451
 Nunechius II 458
 John
 Kyriarcus 500s???
 Theodorus of Laodicea 553
 Tyberius 
 Eustathius
 Theodorus II 870
 Sisinnius II
 Paulus
 Simeon 
 Michael 1082 

 Unknown bishop at Synod of Constantinople 1140
 Gerard, bishop of Laodicea   1159.
 Basilius
 Theophylact 1450

Catholic titular bishops
 Georg (Jerzy) (1446 Appointed - 1461) 
 Rodrigo de San Ginés, (Appointed 21 Apr 1501 ) 
 Laurentius Montonis, (Appointed 22 Apr 1504) 
 Franciscus Ladini Appointed 4 Sep 1517 - ) 
 Dominik Malachowski, (3 Apr 1527 - 15 Mar 1544) 
 Giovanni Antonio Melegnano (Appointed 6 Feb 1534 ) 
 Erasmus de Cracovia, (14 Nov 1544 - ) 
 Andrzej Spot, (23 Mar 1547 - 5 Mar 1560) 
 Leonardo Marini, (5 Mar 1550 - 26 Jan 1560) 
 Stanisław Słomowski (Szbomowski)  (14 Feb 1560 - 7 Sep 1565) 
 Marcin Białobrzeski (3 Apr 1566 - 19 Jul 1577) 
 Gonzalo Herrera Olivares (23 Jul 1568 - 20 Sep 1579) 
 Jakub Milewski (6 Oct 1578 - 20 Nov 1586) 
 Paweł Dembski (11 Mar 1587 Appointed - 28 Feb 1614 Died) 
 Cristoforo Caetani (10 May 1623 - 2 Oct 1634) 
 Girolamo Binago, (12 Jan 1637 - 17 Oct 1643) 
 Wojciech Lipnicki (5 Feb 1646 - 4 Jun 1657) 
 Girolamo Buonvisi (17 Jul 1651 - 28 May 1657) 
 Giulio Spinola (14 Jan 1658 - 18 Jul 1667) 
 Rodulphus Acquaviva (12 Mar 1668 - 12 May 1672) 
 Albert Ernst von Wartenberg (10 Nov 1687 - 9 Oct 1715) 
 Federico Caccia (2 Jan 1693 - 13 Apr 1693) 
 Vincenzo Bichi  (11 Dec 1702  - 31 Mar 1732) 
 Giacomo Oddi  (9 Jun 1732 - 5 Apr 1745) 
 Girolamo Spínola † (13 Apr 1744 - 15 Dec 1760) 
 Girolamo Palermo, C.R. † (5 Aug 1765 Appointed - 2 Aug 1776 Died) 
Manuel Buenaventura Figueroa Barrero  (1 Oct 1782 Appointed - 3 Apr 1783 Died) 
Juan Acisclo de Vera y Delgado  (20 Jul 1801 Appointed - 15 Mar 1815)
Faustino Zucchini (19 Apr 1822 Appointed - ) 
Vincento Garofoli (24 Feb 1832 Appointed - 3 Feb 1839 Died) 
Nicolaus Murad  (9 Oct 1843 Appointed - 26 Dec 1862 Died) 
Raphael de Martinis, (28 Apr 1896 Appointed - 15 Feb 1900 Died) 
Diomede Panici (19 Apr 1900 Appointed - 6 Aug 1909 Died) 
Beda Giovanni Cardinale (3 Feb 1910 Appointed - 8 Nov 1910) 
Sébastien Herscher (19 Jan 1911 Appointed - 25 Aug 1931 Died) 
Amleto Giovanni Cicognani (17 Mar 1933 - 18 Dec) 
Émile André Jean-Marie Maury (8 Jul 1959 Appointed - 25 Jun 1968 Appointed, Archbishop of Reims)

Suffragan dioceses
Attuda
Aizanoi
Themisonium
Tiberiopolis
Traianopolis (Phrygia) 
Synaus (titular see) 
Cidyessus
Alia

References

Catholic titular sees in Asia
Phrygia
50s establishments in the Roman Empire
Defunct dioceses of the Ecumenical Patriarchate of Constantinople